The Chesterfield transmitting station is a television and radio transmitter which serves the town of Chesterfield in Derbyshire and surrounding areas. It transmits digital television which it is line fed from Sheffield (Crosspool) (also known as the Tapton Hill transmitting station). The Chesterfield transmitter sits on a hillside to the north of the town and transmits digital television and radio services. Before the digital switchover, it was one of the few transmitters in the UK to transmit digital television, but not analogue channel Channel 5, and a number of its digital multiplexes were transmitted on the same channels as Emley Moor so it was not uncommon for co-channel interference to be an issue; similar problems still exist with Sutton Coldfield and Waltham (see external links). These co-channel issues with Emley meant that its output was attenuated to the North.

The transmitter is vertically polarised as are most relays/repeaters. In the early 2000s, an extra smaller tower was added at the side of the larger tower possibly for mobile phone use. Digital radio is broadcast from this site and it is just possible to receive digital radio in Chesterfield from other transmitters, specifically Tapton Hill in Sheffield. From 8 November 2007, the transmitter has broadcast the Digital One DAB Multiplex. Since then, the BBC National DAB Multiplex and the Bauer South Yorkshire have been added. The Chesterfield transmitter is owned by Arqiva (previously NTL).

Transmitted services

Analogue radio

Digital radio

Digital television
In July 2007, it was confirmed by Ofcom that Chesterfield would be remaining a wideband transmitter after DSO (Digital Switchover), although the first three of the six multiplexes will still be available within the original A group. The Chesterfield transmitter had its analogue services switched off on 10 & 24 August 2011. The frequencies for the digital multiplexes also changed, and the power for most multiplexes increased to 400W, apart from BBC B which increased to 800W. Arqiva A & B were restricted to 40W until 12 October 2011. 

On 5 February 2020, BBC A and Digital 3&4 moved to UHF 31 and UHF 37 respectively, with a power increase to 800W, in accordance with the 700MHz clearance programme.

Before switchover

Analogue television
Analogue television signals are no longer transmitted. BBC2 was switched off on 10 August 2011 and the remaining three on 24 August.

Aerial group: A
Polarisation: vertical

See also 
Emley Moor transmitting station
Belmont transmitting station
Waltham transmitting station

References

External links
Info and pictures of Chesterfield transmitter including co-receivable transmitters
The Transmission Gallery: Chesterfield Transmitter photographs and information 
Chesterfield transmitter at UK Free TV

Buildings and structures in Chesterfield, Derbyshire
Mass media in the East Midlands
Transmitter sites in England